Discografía Completa: Edición Especial Gira 98 is a quadruple album that contains Alejandro Sanz's previous albums, it was edited for the 1998 Tour Más.

Track listing

CD1 (Viviendo Deprisa) 
 Los Dos Cogidos de la Mano - 5:02
 Pisando Fuerte - 4:28
 Lo Que Fui Es lo Que Soy - 4:40
 Todo Sigue Igual - 5:13
 Viviendo Deprisa - 3:17
 Se Le Apagó la Luz - 4:46
 Duelo al Amanecer - 3:31
 Completamente Loca - 3:32
 Toca Para Mi - 4:07
 Es Este Amor - 3:34

CD2 (Si Tú Me Miras) 
 Si Tú Me Miras - 4:14
 Tu Letra Podré Acariciar - 3:34
 El Escaparate - 4:46
 Cómo Te Echo de Menos - 4:00
 Cuando Acabas Tú - 4:01
 Mi Primera Canción - 4:36
 Vente al Más Allá - 3:56
 Qué No Te Daría Yo - 3:34
 Este Pobre Mortal - 3:36
 A Golpes Contra el Calendario - 5:02

CD3 (3) 
 La Fuerza del Corazón - 5:05
 Por Bandera - 4:59
 Mi Soledad y Yo - 4:57
 Ellos Son Así - 4:39
 Quiero Morir en Tu Veneno (D'Romy Ledo, Adolfo Rubio, Alejandro Sanz) - 4:02
 ¿Lo Ves? - 3:48
 Canción Sin Emoción - 4:48
 Eres Mía - 5:25
 Ese Que Me Dio Vida - 3:58
 Se Me Olvidó Todo al Verte - 4:39
 ¿Lo Ves? (piano y voz) - 3:35

CD4 (Más) 
 Y, ¿Si Fuera Ella? - 5:22
 Ese Último Momento - 5:04
 Corazón Partío - 5:46
 Siempre Es de Noche - 4:47
 La Margarita Dijo No - 4:52
 Hoy Que No Estás - 5:10
 Un Charquito de Estrellas - 4:50
 Amiga Mía - 4:48
 Si Hay Dios... - 5:36
 Aquello Que Me Diste - 4:46

Album certifications

References

Alejandro Sanz compilation albums
1998 compilation albums